The 2010 Porsche Carrera Cup Italia season was the fourth Porsche Carrera Cup Italy season. It began on 24 April in Misano and finished on 24 October in Monza. Alessandro Balzan won the championship driving for Ebimotors, which won the teams' championship.

Teams and drivers

Race calendar and results

Championship standings

Drivers' Championship

† — Drivers did not finish the race, but were classified as they completed over 75% of the race distance.

Teams' Championship

† — Drivers did not finish the race, but were classified as they completed over 75% of the race distance.

Silver Cup
The Silver Cup is the trophy reserved to the gentlemen drivers.

External links
 

Porsche Carrera Cup Italy seasons
Porsche Carrera Cup Italy